Al Karamah (literally meaning dignity), or simply Karama or Karamah, formerly known as Sahyun, is a village in administrative division (nahiyah) of Safita in the Tartus Governorate of Syria.

References

Populated places in Safita District